Laraesima albosignata is a species of beetle in the family Cerambycidae. It was described by Henry Walter Bates in 1885. It is known from Guatemala.

References

Compsosomatini
Beetles described in 1885